Number the Brave is the 11th studio album by rock band Wishbone Ash. It is the first album in the band's history recorded without founding bassist/vocalist Martin Turner. Turner was replaced (for this album only) by John Wetton, formerly of King Crimson and Uriah Heep. Also featured on Number the Brave was singer Claire Hamill as backing vocalist, who would join Wishbone Ash on the 1981 tour to promote the album.  Following "Vas Dis" on Pilgrimage and "Helpless" on Just Testing, the album featured only the third cover version released by the band on a studio album, Smokey Robinson's "Get Ready", previously a hit for The Temptations.

The album peaked at No. 61 in the UK Albums Chart.

Track listing

Original UK release

Side one
"Loaded" (Laurie Wisefield/Steve Upton/Andy Powell) – 4:10
"Where Is the Love" (Upton/Wisefield/Powell) – 3:17
"Underground" (Powell/Wisefield/Upton) – 4:13
"Kicks on the Street" (Upton/Wisefield/Powell) – 4:14
"Open Road" (Upton/Wisefield/Powell) – 5:16

Side two
"Get Ready" (Smokey Robinson) – 3:14
"Rainstorm" (Wisefield/Upton/Powell) – 4:51
"That's That" (John Wetton) – 3:03
"Roller Coaster" (Wisefield/Powell/Upton) – 3:18
"Number the Brave" (Powell/Upton/Wisefield) – 4:53

Original US release

Side one
"Get Ready"
"Where Is the Love"
"That's That"
"Roller Coaster"
"Number the Brave"

Side two
"Loaded"
"Underground"
"Rainstorm"
"Kicks on the Street"
"Open Road"

Personnel
Wishbone Ash
Andy Powell – vocals (tracks 2, 3, 4, 5, 6, 10), guitar
Laurie Wisefield – vocals (tracks 1, 7, 9), guitar, slide guitar
Steve Upton – drums
John Wetton – bass guitar, keyboards, lead vocal (8)

Additional personnel
Claire Hamill – backing vocals
Gasper Lawal – percussion

Production
Nigel Gray – producer
Penny Gibbons – coordinator
Howard Barrett – equipment
John Sherry – management
Cream – sleeve design

Charts

References

1981 albums
Wishbone Ash albums
MCA Records albums
Albums produced by Nigel Gray